Arthur King (6 August 1887–?) was a Scottish professional footballer who played for Aberdeen, Tottenham Hotspur, Belfast Celtic and Dumbarton.

Football career 
King joined Tottenham Hotspur in 1913 from Aberdeen. The goalkeeper played a total of 20 matches in all competitions for the Spurs between 1913–14. After leaving White Hart Lane, King signed for Belfast Celtic before joining Dumbarton in December 1929 where he played in 62 matches in all competitions.

References 

1887 births
People from Garioch
Scottish footballers
Association football goalkeepers
English Football League players
NIFL Premiership players
Scottish Football League players
Aberdeen F.C. players
Dumbarton F.C. players
Tottenham Hotspur F.C. players
Belfast Celtic F.C. players
Year of death missing
Footballers from Aberdeenshire